A light organ is an electronic device which automatically converts an audio signal (such as music) into rhythmic light effects. In the 1970s, light organs were a popular lighting effect used in discotheques and dance parties; and also during that period, the home entertainment manufacturer Morse-Electrophonic produced some of their stereo systems with a built-in light organ display (such as their "Stereo Bar"). The multicolored lights of the light organ would pulsate to the beat of the music.

Technology
The circuit of a light organ separates the audio signal into frequency bands and controls the light channels according to the average level of each band using dimmers. A typical party light organ of the 1970s had three spotlights, red, green and blue, for sounds in bass, medium frequency and high frequency.

Due to their simple structure, light organs were popular as DIY projects for electronics hobbyists in the 1970s and can still be found for sale on the internet.

In 1971, the Rickenbacker guitar company offered their 331LS "Lightshow" model (and matching bass, model 4005LS), the body of which contained a three-channel light organ (with a dimmer); each channel corresponded to the pitch of the strings being played.  The soundboard on these models was replaced with thin Plexiglas cutouts over a translucent moire diffraction material.

With the widespread adoption of cheap PCs, some hobbyists started experimenting with using PCs for frequency analysis instead of analog filters.

See also
 Color organ
 Discotheque
 Lighting console

References

Visual music
Light sources
Light fixtures
1970s introductions